Scheduling Institute is a national private corporation headquartered in Alpharetta, Georgia, that focuses on teaching practice growth strategies to Doctors in various medical fields – with the majority of their client base in dental fields. Scheduling Institute is the world’s largest dental training company. They provide various trainings, seminars, coaching events, and advising services to more than 2,300 practices around the world.

Jay Geier founded the Scheduling Institute in 1997 to teach practices how to properly answer their phones in order to get new patients to schedule an appointment. The company has since diversified their services and now provides 26 types of in-office trainings and multiple coaching programs for their clients.

History 
Jay Geier developed the Scheduling Institute concept when working as Vice President of Marketing for a large private practice in Georgia. Geier’s marketing generated plenty of calls to the office, but the calls were not translating into new patients. He realized it did not matter how many calls his marketing generated if the people answering the phones did not know how to turn these calls into new patients. With this realization the concept behind the Scheduling Institute was born. Geier spent the next few years studying phone calls made to the practice and testing different techniques for handling these phone calls. Eventually, calls began to translate into new patients, with as many as 601 new patients booked in one week.

Jay Geier spoke at conventions while developing the Scheduling Institute’s first product: a self-study kit, coined the New Patient Generation System, that taught doctors how to leverage their most valuable asset – their staff. The self-study kit was first released in 1997. Even though the kit was working and doctors were increasing their new patients, Jay could see that the self-study kit alone didn’t provide enough accountability for many doctors. In 2005 the Scheduling Institute implemented its first membership program, which included telephone accountability for doctors and their staff.

In 2006, one doctor realized that he was never going to take the time to implement the self-study kit on his own, so he asked Geier to come to his practice to implement the kit and train his team in person. After returning from the training, Geier could tell that having in-office trainings was extremely effective for a practice’s growth and engagement, but knew that he was not willing to personally fly all over the country to train practices. Instead, he personally selected and trained Scheduling Institute’s “Certified Training Specialists”, and began offering in-office trainings – coined “On-Site Trainings” – to clients.

Expansion

Headquarters 
In 2000, Scheduling Institute purchased its first headquarters in Roswell, GA, which was only 1,200 square feet. In 2005 it moved to a 2,400 square-foot suite nearby. In 2008, Scheduling Institute purchased the adjoining suite as space for an on-site Fulfillment team, adding another 2,400 square feet. By 2011 the Scheduling Institute had outgrown its Roswell headquarters, and was moved to its current location in Alpharetta, Georgia – a 37,318 square-foot building with its own in-house Fulfillment center.

Atlanta Training Center 
In 2007, the Scheduling Institute introduced its first coaching program. The coaching program included workshops, trainings, and coaching sessions. Scheduling Institute’s Roswell, GA location was not convenient for the majority of their members, many of whom were flying in from out of town to attend these workshops. So, in 2010 Jay Geier acquired the Scheduling Institute’s first training center in Downtown Atlanta. This 8,003 square foot area occupied the second floor of a building in the Georgia International Convention Center. In 2012, Scheduling Institute expanded into the third floor of the building as well, adding 9,250 square feet to their training space.

Phoenix Training Center 
A large percentage of Scheduling Institute’s client base is located on the West Coast, and these members had to spend a significant amount of time and money to fly out to Atlanta, Georgia for workshops and events. So in 2013 Scheduling Institute decided to acquire a second training center on the west coast, and purchased a 23,000 square-foot facility in the resurgent Warehouse District of Phoenix, Arizona. This location, which opened in February 2015, was chosen in order to better accommodate clients who live on the west coast. Downtown Phoenix Inc.’s Vice President of Economic Development praised the Scheduling Institute for the business it brings in from outside of Phoenix.

Services

On-Site Training 
The Scheduling Institute now provides over 26 types of On-Site Trainings for their clients, teaching subjects such as new patient generation, marketing, case acceptance, team building, and patient experience, among others. They have trained in all 50 states, as well as in Canada, Puerto Rico, Ireland, England, France, New Zealand, Australia, Latvia, and others. In May of 2015, Scheduling Institute hit its 10,000th On-Site Training.

Hygiene Training 
In 2011, Scheduling Institute began to offer Hygiene On-Site Trainings. These trainings are designed specifically for Hygienists, and are taught by Registered Dental Hygienists who became “Certified Training Specialists” with the Scheduling Institute. The trainings cover topics such as efficiency and streamlining, patient retention, increasing production, and patient-centric care.

Coaching Programs 
In 2007 the Scheduling Institute launched its first coaching program, the Platinum Coaching Program. The program included workshops, an On-Site Training, 4 teleseminars with Jay Geier, coaching calls, a personal advisor, and telephone accountability. It focuses on teaching financial accountability and growing one’s net income. 
In 2011 the Scheduling Institute launched an advanced coaching program, the“5X Coaching Program”. The program was created when Scheduling Institute realized that some of their clients were purchasing four On-Site Trainings, “The U”, and were attending all events on top of their Platinum Coaching Program. When many of these doctors grew their practices five times over using all of these services together, Scheduling Institute created the 5X Coaching Program. This program includes every service that the Scheduling Institute offers. It is designed to grow practices at least five times their current size over a span of ten years, with some practices growing five times in as little as three years.

“University” 
In 2010, the Scheduling Institute launched “The U” – its very own “university” for a doctor’s team members. Staff members could enroll in courses that were tailored to their specific role within the practice.

Events 
Scheduling Institute members attend multiple events each year hosted by Jay Geier. The events range in size and are hosted at several locations around the United States including Atlanta, Houston, San Francisco, Chicago, New York, Phoenix, and Salt Lake City, among others. Some of the most recent events focused on how dentists can attain financial freedom, improve their marketing, and increase new patients coming to their practice.

 5X Summit: The 5X Summit was a three-day event held in Atlanta, GA at Philips Arena in October 2014. The event had over 5,200 attendees from 48 states and 5 countries. The event had workshops and events for both doctors and team members. Guest speakers included: The Apprentice winner Bill Rancic, Olympic gold medalist Kerri Strug, former NBA star and motivational speaker Walter Bond, Fortune 500 financial advisor Don Barden, Lieutenant Rorke Denver, and Tripp Crosby. Trace Adkins performed a private concert for the event. A Jeep, Mercedes, and Ferrari were given away. Additionally, a Guinness World Record was set for the most selfies taken simultaneously.
 TBMSE: The Best Marketing Seminar Ever, or “TBMSE”, took place for the first time in June 2012, and was brought back a second time in October 2013. Some of the guest speakers included founder and publisher of Dentaltown, Orthotown, and Hygienetown Magazines Howard Farran, marketing copywriter Steve Slaunwhite, Dentistry From The Heart founder Vincent Monticciolo, and sales trainer Ben Gay III.

Recognition
Jay Geier’s Scheduling Institute won Dentaltown’s Townie Choice Award in the “Practice Management Consultant” category in 2010, 2011, 2012, 2013, 2014 and 2015. They won Orthotown’s Townie Choice Award in the “Practice Management Consultant” category in 2013, 2014, and 2015.

The Scheduling Institute was recognized at Association for Corporate Growth’s “Georgia Fast 40” as one of the fastest growing lower middle-market companies in the state of Georgia in 2012, 2013, and 2014.

In both 2013 and 2014 the Atlanta Business Chronicle named the Scheduling Institute as one of the “Top 10 Best Places to Work in Atlanta” in the medium-sized company category.

In 2011, Scheduling Institute was awarded Dental Product Shopper's Best Product in 2011 in the Practice Development category.

Class Action Lawsuit 
In 2016, a class action lawsuit was filed against the Scheduling Institute under the Telephone Consumer Protection Act ("TCPA"). The lawsuit alleged that Scheduling Institute violated the TCPA by sending fax advertisements that did not contain the required opt-out notice and without prior express consent. The Scheduling Institute denied any liability and denied that this case could be certified as a class action if it were litigated. A proposed settlement would have the Scheduling Institute pay $950,000 into a Settlement Fund that will include money for Settlement Class Members.

Philanthropy 
The Scheduling Institute emphasizes to their members the importance of giving back, and has provided numerous opportunities for their clients to help others. In 2014 Scheduling Institute teamed up with Costa Rica Mission Partners so that Scheduling Institute’s members can travel to Costa Rica and provide free dental care to those in need.

Scheduling Institute endorses and encourages their members to participate in Dentistry from the Heart, a nonprofit organization that provides free dental care to those in need within their community.

At the 5X Summit, Jay challenged attendees to donate at least $100,000 for Wounded Warrior Project, and promised that if they reached that goal he would match their $100,000. A total of $224,290 was raised and donated to Wounded Warrior Project. Country music artist Tracy Adkins provided private concert to help promote the Wounded Warrior Project and donations at the event.

The Scheduling Institute’s staff has worked with nonprofits such as Habitat for Humanity, Bright Futures Atlanta, and United Way's Shoebox Project. Scheduling Institute has also donated to Smile Train, a nonprofit organization that provides free corrective cleft surgeries to children. Ten percent of all company profits are donated to charitable causes.

References

External links 
 

Companies based in Atlanta
Management consulting firms of the United States
International management consulting firms
Health care companies based in Georgia (US State)